All That I Am is the twentieth studio album by Santana and follow-up to the band's 2002 Shaman. It was released on October 31, 2005, in most of the world, and a day later in the United States. All That I Am follows the format of his previous two studio releases, consisting primarily of collaborations with other artists. The album debuted at number 2 on the Billboard 200.

Singles
The first single released from All That I Am was "I'm Feeling You" which featured Michelle Branch and the Wreckers, was released in October 2005 after it received radio airplay in the previous month, but only peaked at number 55 on the U.S. Billboard Hot 100. The second single was "Just Feel Better" which featured Steven Tyler; it was released in November 2005 and would peak at number 7 in Australia and number 77 in the UK. The final single was "Cry Baby Cry" which featured Sean Paul and Joss Stone would only peak at number 71 in the UK.

Track listing
 "Hermes" – 4:08
   Written by Carlos Santana and S. Jurad
   Produced by Carlos Santana
 "El Fuego" – 4:17
   Written by Carlos Santana, Jean Shepherd and Richard Shepherd
   Produced by Carlos Santana
 "I'm Feeling You" – 4:13
   Featuring Michelle Branch and The Wreckers
   Written by Kara DioGuardi, John Shanks and Michelle Branch
   Produced by John Shanks and Kara DioGuardi
 "My Man" – 4:37
   Featuring Big Boi and Mary J. Blige
   Written by Antwan Patton, Nsilo Reddick, Nicholas Sherwood and Rob Thomas
   Produced by Big Boi and The Beat Bullies
 "Just Feel Better" – 4:12
   Featuring Steven Tyler
   Written by Jamie Houston, Buck Johnson and Damon Johnson
   Produced by John Shanks
 "I Am Somebody" – 4:02
   Featuring will.i.am
   Written by will.i.am and George Pajon, Jr.
   Produced by will.i.am
   Additional Production Lester Mendez
   This song is considered by most as a tribute to "I Am - Somebody", a poem by Reverend Jesse Jackson.
 "Con Santana" – 3:18
   Featuring Ismaïla and Sixu Toure, also known as Touré Kunda
   Written by Carlos Santana, Ismaïla Toure and Tidane "Sixu" Toure
   Produced by Carlos Santana
 "Twisted" – 5:11
 Featuring Anthony Hamilton
 Written by Dante Ross and Nandi Willis
   Produced by Dante Ross
 "Trinity" – 3:33
   Featuring Kirk Hammett and Robert Randolph
   Written by Carlos Santana and Michael Brook
   Produced by Carlos Santana
   This song is a tribute to the Pakistani musician Nusrat Fateh Ali Khan and is a cover of his song Tere Bina
 "Cry Baby Cry" – 3:53
   Featuring Sean Paul and Joss Stone
   Written by Lester Mendez, Sean Paul, Kara DioGuardi and Jimmy Harry
   Produced and Arranged by Lester Mendez
 "Brown Skin Girl" – 4:44
   Featuring Bo Bice
   Written by Jamie Houston
   Produced by Lester Mendez and Jamie Houston
   Vocal Arrangement by Jamie Houston
 "I Don't Wanna Lose Your Love" – 4:00
   Featuring Los Lonely Boys
   Written by Henry Garza, Ringo Garza and Joey Garza
   Produced by Carlos Santana
   Additional Production by John Proter and Los Lonely Boys
 "Da Tu Amor" – 4:03
   Written by Carlos Santana, Andy Vargas, and Gary Glenn
   Produced by Carlos Santana

Personnel
 Andy Vargas – lead vocals (1, 2, 7, 13)
 Carlos Santana – guitar, background vocals
 Chester Thompson – organ
 Benny Rietveld – bass guitar
 Dennis Chambers – drums
 Karl Perazzo – congas, timbales, percussion, background vocals
 Raul Rekow – congas, background vocals
 Jeff Cressman – trombone
 Bill Ortiz – trumpet

Charts

Weekly charts

Year-end charts

Certifications

Digital Rights Management
This CD is thought to contain MediaMax CD-3 by SunnComm. Some anti-virus and anti-adware programs are attempting to remove said clones and impersonators of said DRM. Sony has recalled all affected CDs and has re-released the album without the DRM.

Notes

References
 All That I Am at CD Universe

Santana (band) albums
2005 albums
Arista Records albums
Albums produced by Clive Davis
Albums produced by will.i.am